Elachista gerasmia is a species of moth of the family Elachistidae that is found in New Zealand and south eastern Australia.

Taxonomy
This species was first described by Edward Meyrick in 1889 from specimens collected in Hamilton, Makatoku in Hawkes Bay and in Invercargill. The male lectotype, collected in Hamilton, is held at the Natural History Museum, London.

Description
The wingspan is 9–14 mm. The forewings are light grey or sometimes grey-whitish. There is a black dot on the fold in the middle, and an elongate black dot in the disc at two-thirds. The hindwings are grey.

Distribution
This species is found in both the North and South Islands of New Zealand as well as in Queensland, New South Wales, South Australia and Tasmania.

Hosts and habitat
Elachista gerasmia inhabits damp swampy habitat. The larvae of this species are leaf miners. Larval hosts include plant species in the genus Juncus including Juncus australis, Juncus pallidus and Juncus usitatus.

References

Moths described in 1889
gerasmia
Moths of Australia
Moths of New Zealand
Taxa named by Edward Meyrick